Wilmington may refer to:

Places

Australia
Wilmington, South Australia, a town and locality
District Council of Wilmington, a former local government area
Wilmington railway line, a former railway line

United Kingdom
Wilmington, Devon
Wilmington, East Sussex
Wilmington, Kent
Wilmington, Kingston upon Hull, East Riding of Yorkshire
Wilmington, Somerset
Lordship of Wilmington, an ancient manor in Kent in the parish of Sellindge

United States
Wilmington, Los Angeles, California, a neighborhood
Wilmington, Delaware
Wilmington Hundred, New Castle County, Delaware
Wilmington, Greene County, Illinois
Wilmington, Will County, Illinois
Wilmington, Indiana
Wilmington, Kansas
Wilmington, Massachusetts
Wilmington station (MBTA), commuter rail station
Wilmington High School (Massachusetts)
Wilmington Township, Minnesota
Wilmington, Minnesota
Wilmington, New York, a town
Wilmington (CDP), New York, the main hamlet in the town
Wilmington, North Carolina, the largest US city, based on population, with the name
Wilmington, Ohio
Wilmington Township, Lawrence County, Pennsylvania
Wilmington Township, Mercer County, Pennsylvania
Wilmington, Vermont, a New England town
Wilmington (CDP), Vermont, the main village in the town
Wilmington, Virginia
Wilmington Island, Georgia
Wilmington River (Georgia)
Wilmington Manor, Delaware
New Wilmington, Pennsylvania, in Lawrence County
South Wilmington, Illinois, in Grundy County

People
 Spencer Compton, 1st Earl of Wilmington (1673–1743), British Prime Minister, 1742–1743, who gave his name to many of the places called Wilmington
 Earl of Wilmington, a title in the Peerage of Great Britain created in 1730 for Spencer Compton
 Lord of Wilmington, an abbreviation of Lord of the Manor of Wilmington, a feudal dignity relating to land originally granted under an Anglo-Saxon charter of 700 C.E.

Educational institutions
Wilmington College (Ohio), Wilmington, Ohio
Wilmington University, New Castle, Delaware
University of North Carolina at Wilmington, Wilmington, North Carolina

Other uses 
 , any of several ships in the United States fleet
Wilmington insurrection of 1898
Wilmington plc, a British publishing and business information company
 Wilmington Subdivision, a railroad line in North Carolina

See also 
 Wilmington station (disambiguation)